Nina "Nutsa" Platonovna Chkheidze (30 September, 1881 – 14 August, 1963) was a Georgian-born Soviet actress.

She was born in Kutaisi. Her mother and sisters were both actresses.  She was the pupil of Lado Aleksi-Meskhishvili. Chkheidze was the first tragic actress in Georgia at just 13 years old when she first came out on stage. In 1894, she took on the role of a little girl called Emma in a performance of "Offender's Family" staged in Kutaisi Theatre and directed by Kote Meskhi.

In 1925, she was awarded the title of People's Artist of the Georgian SSR. She died in Tbilisi and was buried in the Didube Pantheon.

References

External links

Nutsa Chkheidze on Georgian National Filmography

1881 births
1963 deaths
Burials at Didube Pantheon
20th-century actresses from Georgia (country)
Stage actresses from Georgia (country)
People from Kutaisi
Actresses from the Russian Empire
Soviet actresses